A pitcher is a playing position in the game of baseball or softball.

Pitcher or pitchers may also refer to:

General
Pitcher (container), a container for fluids
Pitcher (surname), a surname
Pitchers (ceramic material), scrap ceramic material
Pitcher plant, one of a type of carnivorous plants
a slang term for an individual who takes the dominant or penetrative role in sexual intercourse, especially between two men

Places
Pitcher, New York, a town
Pitcher Township, Cherokee County, Iowa
Pitcher Mountain, a summit in New Hampshire

Other
TVF Pitchers, a web-series created by The Viral Fever.

See also
 Picher (disambiguation)